James Douglas Genn is a Canadian film and TV writer and director born in Vancouver, British Columbia in 1972.

His work includes the feature film Old Stock and the Genie Award nominated short film The Dog Walker, produced at the Canadian Film Centre in Toronto, where he completed a director's residency in 2003.  His work has screened at festivals around the world and has earned him several awards, such as CSA, Genie, Gemini, and DGC award nominations, and the first ever Philip Borsos Award. Recent projects directed for television include multiple episodes of Ransom, Mary Kills People's "No Happy Endings Here" and Rookie Blue for Global; Burden of Truth's "Witch Hunt"/"The Devil in the Desert", Rabbittown and Kim's Convenience for the CBC; Let's Get Physical for POP; HBO Canada's Call Me Fitz; and Todd and the Book of Pure Evil for Space.

He is the son of Canadian artist Robert Genn, the brother of musician Dave Genn, and is the twin brother to artist and musician Sara Genn. Prior to working exclusively as a director and writer, Genn had a successful career in Canada as a sound designer.

External links 

 
 

1972 births
Screenwriters from British Columbia
Canadian television directors
Film directors from Vancouver
Living people
Canadian Film Centre alumni
Canadian twins
Writers from Vancouver